The 1992 Great Britain Lions tour of Australasia was a tour by the Great Britain national rugby league team, nicknamed the 'Lions', of Papua New Guinea, Australia and New Zealand which took place between May and July 1992. The tour was the last of such length undertaken by the Great Britain team, and included a test match against Papua New Guinea, a three-test series against Australia for The Ashes, and a two-test series against New Zealand for the Baskerville Shield, all interspersed with matches against local club and representative teams.

Taking place following the conclusion of England's 1991–92 Rugby Football League season and during Australia's 1992 Winfield Cup premiership season, the tour led to friction between the Great Britain team's management and the Australian Rugby League over match scheduling and promotion. For the first time ever, a Lions tour was shown live on television in the United Kingdom through Sky Sports. The commentators for the tour were Eddie Hemmings and former Lions World Cup hooker Mike Stephenson who had a greater insight into the Australian game having spent most of the 1970s and 1980s, playing, coaching and commentating in the Sydney premiership. The Lions finished the tour with thirteen wins and four losses and a profit of £244,645. Unfortunately for the Lions, three of their losses came in the Test matches, two against Australia and one against New Zealand with the other loss coming against Sydney club side Parramatta.

Touring squad 
A 32-man squad was selected for the tour, including 13 players from Wigan, setting a record for the number of players supplied by one club. One of the Wigan players selected was Andy Gregory, who had announced his international retirement in 1990, but made himself available for selection after being persuaded to reconsider his decision. From the originally selected squad, Leeds scrum-half Bobbie Goulding was dropped due to suspension, and Widnes' Welsh international Jonathan Davies (who had spent part of 1991 playing with Sydney club Canterbury-Bankstown) withdrew from the squad due to injury. Aston, Hulme, Sampson, McNamara, Myers and Harrison were called up during the tour to replace injured players.

Hull F.C. winger Paul Eastwood was the leading point scorer on tour with 58 from 3 tries and 23 goals (he was also the leading goal kicker on tour). Wigan winger Martin Offiah, who before the tour was the undisputed "fastest player in rugby league", was the leading try scorer with 7.

The coach was former Great Britain international Mal Reilly, marking his fourth Lions tour after appearing as a player on the successful 1970 tour and coaching the 1988 and 1990 touring teams. The assistant coach was Widnes coach and the Rugby Football League's Director of Coaching Phil Larder. The team manager was RFL and Wigan President Maurice Lindsay. Ellery Hanley was the tour captain, but due to injury only played in one game on tour. Garry Schofield was subsequently named the Test captain while Featherstone Rovers halfback Deryck Fox was the team captain when either Hanley or Schofield weren't playing.

Papua New Guinea 
The first country the touring Lions visited was Papua New Guinea.

This match saw the most points scored of any match on the tour.

Australia 
The Lions next traveled to Australia to contest The Ashes series. The Ashes series attracted 103,419 fans across the three tests, including the first ever Ashes test played in Melbourne. This was the largest Ashes attendance in Australia since 133,791 had attended the 1974 Ashes series and easily eclipsed the 66,792 of 1979, the 75,480 of 1984 and the 67,554 who attended the 1988 series.

The three Ashes series tests took place at the following venues. For the first time an Ashes test was played outside of the traditional rugby league states of New South Wales and Queensland.

In what can only be described as bad scheduling, the Lions faced the Canberra Raiders on a Saturday night with the Raiders due to play a club game against Parramatta the next afternoon. This saw Raiders coach Tim Sheens not playing the likes of Australian test players Mal Meninga, Bradley Clyde, Steve Walters and Laurie Daley, as well as David Furner, Phil Blake, Darren Fritz, Brett Hetherington and Paul Osborne. It also saw Canberra go into the match with 7 players on the bench, though Sheens would only use the regulation 4. Andy Gregory served notice of his form by leading the Lions to a 20-6 half time lead, though he aggravated a groin injury when he put in a grubber kick for one of Andy Platt's two tries late in the first half and with the first test less than a week away did not return for the second half.

With the first test only three days after the game, Steelers coach Graham Murray was without the services of goal kicking Australian test winger Rod Wishart. The Steelers, in their first and only game against an international touring side, almost pulled off an upset until a late Kevin Ellis field goal sealed a tense 11–10 win for the tourists.

The Ashes series 
The 1992 Ashes series was the final Ashes series to date played in Australia and attracted 103,459 spectators over the three tests. This compared favourably to the 75,480 aggregate of the 1984 Ashes series in Australia and the 67,554 aggregate of the 1988 series in Australia. A large number of English fans followed their team on the tour, but with Great Britain's wins in the final test of 1988 and the first test of the 1990 series, public interest had risen with Australia, although still winning, proving less dominant than during the 1980s.

After 4 of the previous 5 Ashes series had been controlled by French referees (Julien Rascagneres in 1982 and 1986, Francois Desplas in 1988 and Alain Sablayrolles in 1990 – none of whom spoke any English), which had brought numerous complaints from both sides regarding their incompetency, the Rugby League International Federation, ARL and RFL agreed to the use of New Zealand referee Dennis Hale (who had been a touch judge in the 1988 Rugby League World Cup Final) for all three tests.

First Test 
With Ellery Hanley out injured, Mal Reilly appointed five-eighth Garry Schofield as British captain for the first test. The Australians stuck with most of those who had won the 1991 Trans-Tasman Test series against New Zealand, with only winger Michael Hancock in for an injured Willie Carne, prop Glenn Lazarus (for Craig Salvatori) and second rowers Paul Sironen and Bob Lindner returning to the side with Newcastle Knights prop forward Paul Harragon making his test debut. Peter Jackson was also re-called to the side after Dale Shearer who had been selected in the centres had been ruled out with injury. Shearer, who had been widely tipped never to play test football again after a poor Game 1 against New Zealand the previous year, had starred at fullback for Queensland in the State of Origin series and was selected in the centres for all three tests, but was an injury withdrawal on each occasion. Jackson's recall at five-eighth saw Laurie Daley moved to the centres.

Lions winger Martin Offiah made two clean breaks down his left wing in the first half after poor Australian kicks and defence had given him two opportunities to showcase his speed, but he was put into touch by Australian fullback Andrew Ettingshausen on both occasions when only about 15 metres from scoring (despite being probably the quickest player in the Australian team, ET later admitted that had he needed to chase him, Offiah would have had too much pace). The first break came from a sweeping backline movement which saw Offiah into open space. He easily outpaced Allan Langer, but Ettingshausen's desperate push was enough for him to put a foot into touch. On the second occasion, a poor mid-field kick from Langer and poor defence from both Mal Meninga and Rod Wishart who attempted a two-man tackle on Offiah, only to collide with each other and fall off. This again saw him into open space with again only Ettinghausen to beat, but the Australian fullback was equal to the task and easily bundled the flying winger into touch.

Man of the match Bradley Clyde and Kangaroos captain Mal Meninga, with two tries, had a night to remember, leading the home side to a 22-6 win. The Lions only try came midway through the second half to replacement back Joe Lydon who put in a clever grubber behind Hancock who couldn't turn and chase in time which saw Lydon score in the corner.

The attendance of 40,141 at the Football Stadium was the largest crowd for an Australia vs Great Britain test in Sydney since 55,505 saw the final test of the 1974 Ashes series at the Sydney Cricket Ground. It was also the first test match played since Australia defeated France in front of 50,077 at the Sydney Cricket Ground during 1977 Rugby League World Cup to attract a crowd of over 40,000 in Sydney.

Lions winger Martin Offiah, generally regarded at the time as the fastest player in rugby league, participated in a highly publicised 100 metre foot race with Parramatta Eels speedster Lee Oudenryn before the tour match against the Eels. With both players decked out in their full football gear, including boots, Offiah's fastest player standing took a beating when Oudenryn (a former soccer player who had only played 5 games of first grade before the Lions game) won by a yard. Rumours soon surfaced (allegedly started by former Kangaroos hooker Benny Elias) that with Offiah the odds-on favourite, a few of his Lions teammates had heavily backed the Eels flyer to win and that Offiah had tanked so they could collect. Offiah would get his revenge later in the night with 2 tries, one a long range try where Oudenryn failed to make ground on him in a 50-metre chase. The match against Parramatta also saw the largest non-test crowd of the Lions tour with 18,220 in attendance. In what was another piece of bad scheduling, this game on a Friday night was played only two days before the Eels were due to play a club game against Manly Warringah.

Against a strong Newcastle side that was missing only Australian test front rower Paul Harragon, the Lions achieved their only clean sheet of the tour with a 22–0 win at the Marathon Stadium. Winger Alan Hunte, reportedly the second fastest player in the squad behind only Martin Offiah, grabbed 2 tries in the win.

Second Test 
For the second test Britain fielded an all-Wigan forward pack, and with Andy Gregory injured, Shaun Edwards came in at scrum half-back for his first start against the Australians in test football. The Australians went in with an almost unchanged side, though David Gillespie came into the front row with Glenn Lazarus moving to the bench and Chris Johns came into the side for Brad Fittler who was unavailable for personal reasons (Fittler's Penrith Panthers teammate Ben Alexander, the younger brother of Penrith captain and former Australian test halfback Greg Alexander, was killed in a motor vehicle accident 5 days prior to the test).

The match, played at the Princes Park Australian rules football ground under temporary lighting, was the first ever Ashes test in Australia played in Melbourne. The cold, wet conditions suited the Lions who levelled the series with a resounding 33-10 win after going into half-time with a 22-0 lead in front of 31,005 fans.

The second test, played on a cold and wet night at Melbourne's Princes Park, saw Australian captain Mal Meninga equal Reg Gasnier's record of 36 tests for Australia. It turned out that the conditions (as well as the slippery surface), suited the Lions with many claiming it was more like English weather than Australian.

The British got off to a 4 - 0 lead after some penalties kicked by Paul Eastwood early in the first half. A brawl started by Australian forward Paul Harragon got the Lions another penalty and they decided to attack the Kangaroos' line. From the resulting good field position, first receiver Philip Clarke was able to throw a dummy and make a break through the defensive line to dive over for the first try of the match. It was then converted by Eastwood, so the visitors led 10 - 0. The next try for Great Britain came when replacement half Shaun Edwards got the ball mid-field and made a break before kicking it ahead into Australia's in-goal area. Several players from both sides came racing through to dive on the ball but the Lions' Paul Newlove was the only one who got his hand on it. Next, Garry Schofield scored a brilliant individual try when he chipped ahead from about fifteen metres out and after running into Australian second rower Paul Sironon, then beat the Australian defence to dive on it after Andrew Ettingshausen went what television commentator Graeme Hughes called "ice skating" on the slippery in-goal surface. Great Britain thus went into the break leading 22 - 0.

Schofield kicked a drop goal to open the scoring in the second half, making it 23 nil. Australia then got their first try fifteen minutes into the second half when Bob Lindner got the ball at first receiver close to the line and reached out from the tackle to touch the ball down. The next try came from Chris Johns (who had come on to the wing to replace an injured Rod Wishart) who ran onto replacement half Kevin Walters' pass from about fifteen metres out through a gap in the defence to score. Back in Australia's half, British fullback Graham Steadman got the ball at first receiver about twenty metres out and outpaced Andrew Ettingshausen down the right sideline to score in the corner, sealing the match for the tourists. The British then added to their score when Schofield got the ball around mid-field, chipped it over the defence and regarthered it. He found Martin Offiah in support, the speedy winger beating Australian fullback Ettingshausen in a race for the left corner. This left the final score at 33 - 10, equalling Great Britain's largest ever winning margin and Australia's second-largest ever losing margin

Former Australian test skipper, Gold Coast captain/coach Wally Lewis, was a late withdrawal for the Seagulls with a hamstring injury.

Third Test 
The third and final test was allocated points for the 1989–1992 Rugby League World Cup.

By playing in this, his 37th test match, Australian captain Mal Meninga became his country's most-capped test player, breaking the record of former Australian captain Reg Gasnier who was on hand to congratulate Meninga on his achievement. Meninga also equalled Keith Holman's record for most tests against Great Britain (11). His try and four goals also brought his total of points scored in Anglo-Australian test matches to 108, overtaking Neil Fox's record.

The third test at Lang Park in Brisbane was played in warm, dry conditions in total contrast to the second test. Mal Meninga (4) and Paul Eastwood (2) traded goals for the only scores in the first half. Lions captain Garry Schofield had the best scoring opportunity of the first half when put into a gap only 10 metres out from the Australian line, but the pass from Paul Newlove was called forward by referee Dennis Hale. Late in the half a fight erupted with rival hookers Steve Walters (Aust) and Martin Dermott (GB) trading blows. Meninga then kicked a penalty goal to give the home side an 8-4 lead at half time.

Laurie Daley scored the first try of the game midway through the second half. Andrew Ettingshausen played the ball only 5 metres out from the Lions line and Brad Fittler, back in the side after missing the Melbourne test, ran infield from dummy half. He stepped back inside and popped a pass to Daley who juggled the ball, but managed to get through the tackle of Schofield and Shaun Edwards to get it down for a try amidst howls of protests from Phil Clarke who was claiming a knock on. Meninga missed the difficult conversion but the Aussies led 12-4. Then with 15 minutes remaining, Meninga put the Aussies further ahead with a try from a Laurie Daley kick. Meninga won the race to the ball despite a number of Lions converging before powering through the tackle of Edwards and Denis Betts to plant the ball down and give the Aussies a match winning 16-4 lead. Martin Offiah finally showed his speed to give the Lions some hope in the last 5 minutes, After Dermott hit Meninga in a side on tackle which caused the Australian captain to spill the ball, Offiah toed ahead a loose ball 30 metres out from his line before regathering and racing 50 metres to score under the posts with only Kevin Walters in pursuit. Eastwood converted to see the Lions trim the lead to 16-10, but that was as close as they got as the Australian's held out Great Britain to retain The Ashes that they had held since 1974.

Australian forward Brad Clyde was awarded with the Harry Sunderland Medal for the Player of the Series.

The Ashes series was televised in Australia by Seven Network with commentary provided by Graeme Hughes, Pat Welsh and former Australian captain Wally Lewis.

New Zealand 

This was Great Britain's first win over the Auckland representative side since 1979, Auckland had played five with three wins, one loss and one draw against both Great Britain and Australian touring sides since then.

First Test

Second Test 
Great Britain's victory in Auckland ensured that they would face Australia in the World Cup Final in October later in the year.

References

External links 
 New Zealand vs Great Britain 1992 at rugbyleagueproject.org

Great Britain national rugby league team tours
Rugby league tours of Australia
Australia–United Kingdom relations
New Zealand–United Kingdom relations
Papua New Guinea–United Kingdom relations
Great Britain Lions tour of Australia and New Zealand
Great Britain Lions tour of Australia and New Zealand
Great Britain Lions tour of Australia and New Zealand
Great Britain Lions tour of Australasia
Rugby league tours of New Zealand
Rugby league tours of Papua New Guinea